Hallelujah, Anyway – Remembering Tom Cora is a 1999 double-CD compilation album by various artists dedicated to United States cellist and composer Tom Cora, who had died on April 9, 1998. It includes material composed in Cora's memory, songs he had written for other musicians and groups, and a selection of music he had performed and participated in. It was released in May 1999 by John Zorn's Tzadik Records.

One of the tracks, "Talking to the Tree", was performed at Cora's Memorial Concert in May 1998 by Cora's widow, Catherine Jauniaux, and one of his frequent collaborators, Fred Frith.

Reception

Writing in a review at AllMusic, Joslyn Layne described this retrospective compilation as "[u]pbeat, eclectic, eccentric, beautiful". She called Tom Cora "a significant improviser and extraordinary cellist", and said this release was important because it highlighted Cora's "undervalued brilliance". Layne called the album "a worthy eulogy" and "[h]ighly recommended for all with open ears".

Andrew Bartlett said in a review of Hallelujah, Anyway in the Seattle Weekly that it is an "eminently memorable" collection of tributes to Cora, who he said had taken his cello to "untold new places". Bartlett said "[y]ou won't find a better collection of post-1970s avant-garde guiding lights collected anywhere".

Track listing

Sources: AllMusic, Discogs, Tom Cora discography.

Personnel

Tom Cora (3,5,7,12,14,15,17,18,20–23,27,29,30,32,34,37,39) – cello, accordions, home-made instruments, voice
Lesli Dalaba (1) – trumpet
Kazutoki Umezu (2) – alto saxophone
Nakao Kanji (2) – soprano saxophone
Hayashi Eiichi (2) – alto saxophone
Tada Yoko (2) – alto saxophone
Katayama Hiroaki (2) – tenor saxophone
Nomoto Kazuhiro (2) – baritone saxophone
Shimizu Kazuto (2) – bass clarinet
Ohara Yutaka (2) – trombone
Sekijima Takerou (2) – tuba
Kondo Tatsuo (2) – accordion
Keichi (2) – percussion
Phil Minton (3) – voice
Luc Ex (3,21) – bass guitar
Michael Vatcher (3) – drums
Fred Frith (4,14,18,27,37,39) – guitar, home-made instruments, bass guitar
Catherine Jauniaux (4) – voice
Pippin Barnett (5,9) – drums
George Cartwright (5,18) – saxophones
Ann Rupel (5) – bass guitar
Davey Williams (5) – guitar
Amy Denio (6) – voice, percussion, guitar, alto, piano innards, text
Jeroen Visser (6) – collage, mastering
Samm Bennett (8,15) – drums, samples
Ito Haruna (8)
Barry Bless (9) – accordion
Danny Finny (9) – tenor saxophone
Robbie Kinter (9) – percussion, keyboard
George Lowe (9) – bass clarinet
Dave Yohe (9) – bass guitar
Caroline Kraabel (10) – saxophone
John Edwards (10) – bass guitar
Chris Cochrane (11) – voice
Zeena Parkins (11,27,28) – piano
Hakim Hamadouche (12) – lute, voice
Edmond Hosdikian (12) – alto saxophone
Barre Phillips (12) – bass guitar
Ahmed Compaore (12) – drums
Wayne Horvitz (13) – piano
John Zorn (14,23) – alto saxophone, game calls, mouthpieces, soprano saxophone, clarinet
Marc Ribot (15) – guitar
Takeda Kenichi (16) – taishokoto
Okuma Wataru (16,32) – clarinet, chorus, piano
Iwate Hiroshi (16) – saxophone
Chino Shuichi (16) – keyboard
Koyama Tetsuto (16) – bass guitar
Nakao Kanji (16) – drums
Kasuga Hirobumi (16) – guitar
Leo Smith (17) – trumpet, small instruments
Richard Teitelbaum (17) – synthesizer
Carlos Zingaro (17) – violin
Mark Howell (18) – guitar
Rick Brown (18) – drums
Thierry Azam (19) – all instruments
Terrie Ex (21) – guitar
Andy Ex (21) – guitar
Katrin Ex (21) – drums
G.W. Sok (21) – vocals
Eugene Chadbourne (23) – guitar, voice, tape effects
David Licht (23) – drums
Kramer (23,38) – cheap organ, voice, all instruments (on (38))
Miya Masaoka (24) – koto
Larry Ochs (24) – tenor saxophone
Bob Ostertag (24) – samples
Gerry Hemingway (25) – percussion
Elliott Sharp (26) – guitar
Frances-Marie Uitti (26) – cello
Sara Parkins (28) – violin
Margaret Parkins (28) – cello
Iva Bittová (29) – violin, voice
Momo Rossel (30) – guitar
Bratko Bibič (30) – accordion
Jean-Vin Huguenin (30) – bass guitar
Nicolas Collins (31) – backwards electric guitar
Rorie (32) – chorus, marimba
Kimura Shinya (32) – drums
Shinoda Masami (32) – baritone saxophone
Nishimura Takuya (32) – bass guitar
Hahn Rowe (33) – all instruments
Wolfgang Mitterer (34) – piano, prepared piano
Tyson Rogers (35) – piano
Thomas Dimuzio (36) – digital editing and processing
Chris Cutler (37) – drums, processing
Tess (38) – voice
Rebby Sharp (39) – fiddle

Sources: Discogs, Tom Cora discography.

Recording notes
(1) recorded at the corner church, June 1998
(2) recorded on the street in Tokyo, September 1998
(3) recorded at Lagerhaus, Bremen, June 1997
(4) recorded at the Tom Cora Memorial Concert, May 1998
(5) recorded at Water Music, Hoboken, November 1990
(6) recorded at Fish Made Studio, Zürich and Bendy Thing & Spaciouser Spoot Studios, Seattle
(7,18) recorded at Bisi Studio, Brooklyn, Summer 1983
(8) recorded at Mescaluna, Nishinomiya & Polarity, Tokyo, November 1998
(9) recorded at Sound of Music Studios, Richmond (VA)
(11) recorded at Noise, New York, 1987
(12) recorded at Studio Cactus, Marseille, September 1997
(13) recorded at Ironwood Studios, Seattle, November 1998
(14) recorded at WKCR-FM, New York, April 1983
(15) recorded live at the Knitting Factory, New York City, 1990
(16) recorded at G.O.K. Sound, Tokyo, Summer 1995
(17) recorded live at Bard College, May 1993
(19) recorded at Thierry Azam's home, April 1998
(20,22) recorded at Harold Dessau Studio, New York, 1990
(21) recorded live on VPRO Radio 3, La Stampa, August 1991
(23) recorded live in Ohio,  1981
(24) recorded at Division Studio, San Francisco, September 1998
(25) recorded at Roulette, New York City, November 1998
(26) recorded live in Amsterdam, 1998
(27) recorded at CBGB's, New York City, April 1985
(28) recorded at 6/8 Studios, New York, February 1997
(29) recorded at Studio V-Zlin, May 1997
(30) recorded at Studio CCAM, Vand'Oeuvre-les-Nancy, 1989
(32) recorded at Manda-la 2, Tokyo, March 1989
(33) recorded 1998
(34) recorded 1996–1998
(35) recorded June 1998
(37) recorded live at Laboratoires d'Aubervilliers, March 1998
(38) recorded at Virginia's, 1998
(39) recorded at Sunrise, Switzerland, Christmas 1983
Sources: Discogs, Tom Cora discography.

References

1999 compilation albums
Various artists albums
Avant-garde jazz compilation albums
Experimental music compilation albums
Free improvisation albums
Albums produced by Fred Frith
Tzadik Records compilation albums
Albums recorded at WKCR-FM